Tapirs are large, herbivorous mammals belonging to the family Tapiridae. They are similar in shape to a pig, with a short, prehensile nose trunk. Tapirs inhabit jungle and forest regions of South and Central America, with one species inhabiting Southeast Asia. They are one of three extant branches of Perissodactyla (odd-toed ungulates), alongside equines and rhinoceroses. Only a single genus, Tapirus, is currently extant. Tapirs migrated into South America during the Pleistocene epoch from North America after the formation of the Isthmus of Panama as part of the Great American Interchange. Tapirs were once widespread in North America until the arrival of humans at the end of the Late Pleistocene, around 12,000 years ago.

Species

There are four widely recognized extant species of tapir, all in the genus Tapirus of the family Tapiridae. They are the South American tapir, the Malayan tapir, Baird's tapir, and the mountain tapir. In 2013, a group of researchers said they had identified a fifth species of tapir, the kabomani tapir. However, the existence of the kabomani tapir as a distinct species has been widely disputed, and recent genetic evidence further suggests that it actually is part of the species South American tapir.Extant species

The four species are all classified on the IUCN Red List as Endangered or Vulnerable. The tapirs have a number of extinct relatives in the superfamily Tapiroidea. The closest extant relatives of the tapirs are the other odd-toed ungulates, which include horses, donkeys, zebras and rhinoceroses.

General appearance

Their coats are short and range in colour from reddish brown, to grey, to nearly black, with the notable exceptions of the Malayan tapir, which has a white, saddle-shaped marking on its back, and the mountain tapir, which has longer, woolly fur. All tapirs have oval, white-tipped ears, rounded, protruding rumps with stubby tails, and splayed, hooved toes, with four toes on the front feet and three on the hind feet, which help them to walk on muddy and soft ground. Baby tapirs of all types have striped-and-spotted coats for camouflage. Females have a single pair of mammary glands, and males have long penises relative to their body size.

Physical characteristics

The proboscis of the tapir is a highly flexible organ, able to move in all directions, allowing the animals to grab foliage that would otherwise be out of reach. Tapirs often exhibit the flehmen response, a posture in which they raise their snouts and show their teeth to detect scents. This response is frequently exhibited by bulls sniffing for signs of other males or females in oestrus in the area. The length of the proboscis varies among species; Malayan tapirs have the longest snouts and Brazilian tapirs have the shortest. The evolution of tapir probosces, made up almost entirely of soft tissues rather than bony internal structures, gives the Tapiridae skull a unique form in comparison to other perissodactyls, with a larger sagittal crest, orbits positioned more rostrally, a posteriorly telescoped cranium, and a more elongated and retracted nasoincisive incisure.Colbert, Matthew (2002) Tapirus terrestris. Digital Morphology. Retrieved June 20, 2006.

Tapirs have brachyodont, or low-crowned teeth, that lack cementum. Their dental formula is: 
Totaling 42 to 44 teeth, this dentition is closer to that of equids, which may differ by one less canine, than their other perissodactyl relatives, rhinoceroses.Huffman, Brent. Order Perissodactyla at Ultimate Ungulate Their incisors are chisel-shaped, with the third large, conical upper incisor separated by a short gap from the considerably smaller canine. A much longer gap is found between the canines and premolars, the first of which may be absent. Tapirs are lophodonts, and their cheek teeth have distinct lophs (ridges) between protocones, paracones, metacones and hypocones.Myers, P., R. Espinosa, C. S. Parr, T. Jones, G. S. Hammond, and T. A. Dewey. 2006. The Basic Structure of Cheek Teeth. The Animal Diversity Web (online). Retrieved June 20, 2006.

Tapirs have brown eyes, often with a bluish cast to them, which has been identified as corneal cloudiness, a condition most commonly found in Malayan tapirs. The exact etiology is unknown, but the cloudiness may be caused by excessive exposure to light or by trauma.Janssen, Donald L., DVM, Dipl ACZM, Bruce A. Rideout, DVM, PhD, Dipl ACVP, Mark E. Edwards, PhD. "Medical Management of Captive Tapirs (Tapirus sp.)." 1996 American Association of Zoo Veterinarians Proceedings. Nov 1996. Puerto Vallarta, Mexico. Pp. 1–11 However, the tapir's sensitive ears and strong sense of smell help to compensate for deficiencies in vision.

Tapirs have simple stomachs and are hindgut fermenters that ferment digested food in a large cecum.

Lifecycle
Young tapirs reach sexual maturity between three and five years of age, with females maturing earlier than males. Under good conditions, a healthy female tapir can reproduce every two years; a single young, called a calf, is born after a gestation of about 13 months. The natural lifespan of a tapir is about 25 to 30 years, both in the wild and in zoos. Apart from mothers and their young offspring, tapirs lead almost exclusively solitary lives.

Behaviour
Although they frequently live in dryland forests, tapirs with access to rivers spend a good deal of time in and under water, feeding on soft vegetation, taking refuge from predators, and cooling off during hot periods. Tapirs near a water source will swim, sink to the bottom, and walk along the riverbed to feed, and have been known to submerge themselves to allow small fish to pick parasites off their bulky bodies. Along with freshwater lounging, tapirs often wallow in mud pits, which helps to keep them cool and free of insects.

In the wild, the tapir's diet consists of fruit, berries, and leaves, particularly young, tender vegetation. Tapirs will spend many of their waking hours foraging along well-worn trails, snouts to the ground in search of food. Baird's tapirs have been observed to eat around 40 kg (85 lb) of vegetation in one day.

Tapirs are largely nocturnal and crepuscular, although the smaller mountain tapir of the Andes is generally more active during the day than its congeners. They have monocular vision.

Copulation may occur in or out of water. In captivity, mating pairs will often copulate several times during oestrus.Animal Diversity Web fact sheet on Tapirus terrestris Intromission lasts between 10 and 20 minutes.

Habitat, predation, and vulnerability

Adult tapirs are large enough to have few natural predators, and the thick skin on the backs of their necks helps to protect them from threats such as jaguars, crocodiles, anacondas, and tigers. The creatures are also able to run fairly quickly, considering their size and cumbersome appearance, finding shelter in the thick undergrowth of the forest or in water. Hunting for meat and hides has substantially reduced their numbers and, more recently, habitat loss has resulted in the conservation watch-listing of all four species; the Brazilian tapir is classified as vulnerable, and Baird's tapir, the mountain tapir, and the Malayan tapir are endangered. According to 2022 study published in the Neotropical Biology and Conservation, the lowland tapir in the Atlantic Forest is at risk of complete extinction as a result of anthropogenic pressures, in particular hunting, deforestation and population isolation.

Evolution and natural history
The first tapiroids, such as Heptodon, appeared in the early Eocene of North America. They appeared very similar to modern forms, but were about half the size, and lacked the proboscis. The first true tapirs appeared in the Oligocene. By the Miocene, such genera as Miotapirus were almost indistinguishable from the extant species. Asian and American tapirs were believed to have diverged around 20 to 30 million years ago; tapirs later migrated from North America to South America around 3 million years ago, as part of the Great American Interchange. For much of their history, tapirs were spread across the Northern Hemisphere, where they became extinct as recently as 10,000 years ago. T. merriami, T. veroensis, T. copei, and T. californicus became extinct during the Pleistocene in North America. The giant tapir survived until about 4,000 years ago in China.

Approximate divergence times based on a 2013 analysis of mtDNA sequences are 0.5 Ma for T. kabomani and the T. terrestris–T. pinchaque clade, 5 Ma for T. bairdii and the three South American tapirs, and 9 Ma for the branching of T. indicus. T. pinchaque arises from within a paraphyletic complex of T. terrestris populations.

The tapir may have evolved from the paleothere Hyracotherium'' (once thought to be a primitive horse).

Genetics

The species of tapir have the following chromosomal numbers:

The Malayan tapir, the species most isolated geographically and genetically, has a significantly smaller number of chromosomes and has been found to share fewer homologies with the three types of American tapirs. A number of conserved autosomes (13 between karyotypes of Baird's tapir and the South American tapir, and 15 between Baird's and the mountain tapir) have also been found in the American species that are not found in the Asian animal. However, geographic proximity is not an absolute predictor of genetic similarity; for instance, G-banded preparations have revealed Malayan, Baird's and South American tapirs have identical X chromosomes, while mountain tapirs are separated by a heterochromatic addition/deletion.

Lack of genetic diversity in tapir populations has become a major source of concern for conservationists. Habitat loss has isolated already small populations of wild tapirs, putting each group in greater danger of dying out completely. Even in zoos, genetic diversity is limited; all captive mountain tapirs, for example, are descended from only two founder individuals.

Hybrids of Baird's and the South American tapirs were bred at the San Francisco Zoo around 1969 and later produced a backcross second generation.

Conservation
A number of conservation projects have been started around the world. The Tapir Specialist Group, a unit of the IUCN Species Survival Commission, strives to conserve biological diversity by stimulating, developing, and conducting practical programs to study, save, restore, and manage the four species of tapir and their remaining habitats in Central and South America and Southeast Asia.

The Baird's Tapir Project of Costa Rica, begun in 1994, is the longest ongoing tapir project in the world. It involves placing radio collars on tapirs in Costa Rica's Corcovado National Park to study their social systems and habitat preferences.

The Lowland Lowland Tapir Conservation Initiative is a conservation and research organization founded by Patrícia Medici, focused on tapir conservation in Brazil.

Attacks on humans
Tapirs are generally shy, but when scared they can defend themselves with their very powerful jaws. In 1998, a zookeeper in Oklahoma City was mauled and had an arm severed after opening the door to a female tapir's enclosure to push food inside (the tapir's two-month-old baby also occupied the cage at the time). In 2006, Carlos Manuel Rodriguez Echandi (who was then the Costa Rican Environmental Minister) became lost in the Corcovado National Park and was found by a search party with a "nasty bite" from a wild tapir. In 2013, a two-year-old girl suffered stomach and arm injuries after being mauled by a South American tapir in Dublin Zoo during a supervised experience in the tapir enclosure. Dublin Zoo pleaded guilty to breaching health and safety regulations and was ordered to pay €5,000 to charity. However, such examples are rare; for the most part, tapirs are likely to avoid confrontation in favour of running from predators, hiding, or, if possible, submerging themselves in nearby water until a threat is gone.

Frank Buck wrote about an attack by a tapir in 1926, which he described in his book, Bring 'Em Back Alive.

Folklore 
Tapirs feature in the folklore of several cultures around the world. In Japan, tapirs are associated with the mythological Baku, believed to ward off nightmares. In South America, tapirs are associated with the creation of the earth.

References

External links 

 IUCN/SSC Tapir Specialist Group
 The Tapir Gallery at The Tapir Preservation Fund website
 World Tapir Day website
 Baird's Tapir Project of Costa Rica

 
Articles containing video clips
Extant Ypresian first appearances
Taxa named by Morten Thrane Brünnich